William Cosgrove (1888–1936) was an Irish recipient of the Victoria Cross.

William Cosgrove may also refer to:
 William Cosgrove (golfer) (1855–1927), Scottish professional golfer
 William Michael Cosgrove, American Roman Catholic bishop. 
 Bill Cosgrove (1918–1943), Australian rules footballer

See also
 W. T. Cosgrave (William Thomas Cosgrave, 1880–1965), leader of the Irish Free State from 1922 to 1932
 Cosgrove (disambiguation)